Q'illu (Quechua for yellow, Hispanicized spelling Quello)  is a mountain in the Wansu mountain range in the Andes of Peru, about  high. It is situated in the Apurímac Region, Antabamba Province, Antabamba District. Q'illu lies north of Quncha Urqu and northeast of Lluqu Chuyma and Llulluch'a.

References 

Mountains of Peru
Mountains of Apurímac Region